The 2011–12 1. FSV Mainz 05 season is the club's 106th year of existence. They participated in the Bundesliga, DFB-Pokal and the UEFA Europa League.

Review and events
On 19 November, the match against Mainz 05 was cancelled after the referee for the match, Babak Rafati, attempted suicide. The match was eventually rescheduled for 13 December.

Mainz 05 were eliminated from the DFB-Pokal by Holstein Kiel.

For the winter break, Mainz 05 returned to practice on 3 January 2012 at 10:00 CET (UTC+01) and had training camp in Llucmajor, Majorca, from 6 January to 12 January.

Match results

Bundesliga

DFB-Pokal

UEFA Europa League

Player information

Roster and statistics

Transfers

In

Out

Notes

References

1. FSV Mainz 05 seasons
Mainz
Mainz 05